Timothy John Pedley  (born 23 March 1942) is a British mathematician and a former G. I. Taylor Professor of Fluid Mechanics at the University of Cambridge. His principal research interest is the application of fluid mechanics to biology and medicine.

Early life and education
Pedley is the son of Richard Rodman Pedley and Jeanie Mary Mudie Pedley. He was educated at Rugby School and Trinity College, Cambridge.

Academic career
Pedley spent three years at Johns Hopkins University as a post-doctoral fellow. From 1968 to 1973 he was a lecturer at Imperial College London, after which he moved to the Department of Applied Mathematics and Theoretical Physics (DAMTP) at the University of Cambridge. 

Pedley remained at Cambridge until 1990 when he was appointed Professor of Applied Mathematics at the University of Leeds. In 1996 he returned to Cambridge and from 2000 to 2005 he was head of DAMTP.

Research
Pedley has pioneered the application of fluid mechanics to understanding biological phenomena. His best-known work includes the study of blood flow in arteries, flow–structure interactions in elastic tubes, flow and pressure drop in the lung, and the collective behaviour of swimming microorganisms.

His research has touched on issues of medical importance, including arterial bypass grafts, urine flow from kidneys to bladder, and the ventilation of premature infants. His work on microorganisms has application to plankton ecology.

Honours
Pedley is a fellow of Gonville and Caius College, Cambridge and was elected a Fellow of the Royal Society (FRS) in 1995. Pedley was elected a member of the National Academy of Engineering (1999) for research on biofluid dynamics, collapsible tube flow, and the theory of swimming of fish and  microorganisms. In 2008 Pedley and Professor James Murray FRS were jointly awarded the Gold Medal of the Institute of Mathematics and its Applications in recognition of their "outstanding contributions to mathematics and its applications over a period of years".

Marriage and children
In 1965 Pedley married Avril Jennifer Martin Uden, with whom he has two sons. He enjoys birdwatching, running and reading.

References

1942 births
Living people
20th-century British mathematicians
21st-century British mathematicians
Fellows of Gonville and Caius College, Cambridge
Fluid dynamicists
Cambridge mathematicians
Fellows of the Royal Society
Alumni of Trinity College, Cambridge
Academics of Imperial College London
Academics of the University of Leeds
Professors of the University of Cambridge
Journal of Fluid Mechanics editors
People educated at Rugby School